Christian Council may refer to:

 Christian Biblical Council, a splinter group of The Way International
 Christian Council of Britain, an organisation formed to defend Britain's Christian heritage and national identity from Islam and political correctness
 Christian Council of Ghana
 Christian Council of Korea
 Christian Council of Lesotho
 Christian Council of Mozambique
 Christian Council of Sweden
 Christian Council of Tanzania

See also
 National Christian Council (disambiguation)